Ghost is the official soundtrack, on the Milan Records label, of the 1990 Academy Award- and Golden Globe-winning film Ghost starring Patrick Swayze, Demi Moore and Whoopi Goldberg (who won the Academy Award for Best Supporting Actress for her role as "Oda Mae Brown" in this film) and Tony Goldwyn. The score was composed by Maurice Jarre.

The album was nominated for the Academy Award for Best Original Score.

Track listing 
 The Righteous Brothers - "Unchained Melody" - 3:37
 "Ghost" - 7:24
 "Sam" - 5:33
 "Ditto" - 3:19
 "Carl" - 4:06
 "Molly" - 6:17
 "Unchained Melody" (Orchestral Version) - 3:59
 "End Credits" - 4:17
 "Fire Escape" (bonus) - 3:12
 "Oda Mae & Carl" (bonus) - 3:58
 "Maurice Jarre Interview" (bonus) - 9:51

Certifications and sales

References

1990 soundtrack albums
Fantasy film soundtracks
Romance film soundtracks
Thriller film soundtracks